Ralph Helstein (11 December 1908 - 14 February 1985) was an American trade unionist and labour leader best known for leading the United Packinghouse Workers of America (UPWA) as international president from 1946 until 1968.

Early years

Helstein was born in Duluth, Minnesota on December 11, 1908, to an orthodox Jewish family. When he was an infant, his father, a garment manufacturer, moved the household to Minneapolis. There, the Helstein family was part of the city's small but tight knit Jewish community, which came with its challenges. "As I was growing up, I had a strong feeling about this question of discrimation," recounted Helstein. "Part of it may be because I was Jewish and when I was a kid, the kids would go along yelling 'sheeny' and I'd be excluded."

There, Mr. Helstein graduated from the University of Minnesota, receiving a degree in English literature.

Helstein first aspired to a career in medicine, but dropped out of pre-med after he didn't see his name on a posted list of students who successfully passed a required examination. He later learned that it was an error on the school's part but, by then, he was studying law. He got his law degree from the University of Minnesota in 1934.

Great Depression

It was the height of the Depression, and, enthusiastic about President Franklin Roosevelt's concerns and solutions, he went to work for the National Recovery Administration, helping to enforce minimum wage and hour provisions in Minnesota. When the NRA was abolished, he went into private law practice.

References

1908 births
1985 deaths
American trade union leaders
People from Duluth, Minnesota
University of Minnesota Law School alumni
United Food and Commercial Workers people